Elena Olegovna Firsova (also Yelena or Jelena Firssowa; born 21 March 1950) is a Russian composer.

Life
Firsova was born in Leningrad into the family of physicists Oleg Firsov and Viktoria Lichko. She studied music in Moscow with Alexander Pirumov, Yuri Kholopov, Edison Denisov and Philip Herschkowitz. In 1979 she was blacklisted as one of the "Khrennikov's Seven" at the Sixth Congress of the Union of Soviet Composers for unapproved participation in some festivals of Soviet music in the West. She was married to the composer Dmitri Smirnov and lives in the United Kingdom. Their children are Philip Firsov (an artist and sculptor), and Alissa Firsova (a composer, pianist and conductor).

She has composed more than a hundred compositions in many different genres including chamber opera The Nightingale and the Rose after Oscar Wilde and Christina Rossetti (premiered at the 1994 Almeida Opera Festival, London), an orchestra work Augury, (premiered at the 1992 BBC Proms) that includes a choral setting of William Blake's famous lines "To see the world in a grain of sand..." and Requiem to Anna Akhmatova's poem for soprano, chorus and orchestra (premiered at the Konzerthaus Berlin in September 2003).

Her favourite genre is a chamber cantata for solo voice and ensemble (or orchestra). Some of them are written to the poems by Alexander Pushkin, Marina Tsvetaeva, Boris Pasternak and Oleg Prokofiev. However, most of them are setting the poems by her favourite poet Osip Mandelstam that include Earthly Life,  Tristia, The Stone, Forest Walks, Before the Thunderstorm, Stygian Song, Secret Way,  Seashell, Whirlpool, Silentium, Winter Songs, and Petrarch's Sonnets (in Russian translation by Osip Mandelstam).

She received commissions from many music festivals, orchestras and ensembles including the Concertgebouw Orchestra, Brodsky Quartet, Manchester Wind Orchestra, Schubert Ensemble, Freden Festival, BBC Proms, Asiago Festival, and Expo 2000 (Hanover). Her music is available through publishers Boosey & Hawkes, London; Hans Sikorski, Hamburg; G. Schirmer, New York.

Works

Concerto 

 Cello Concerto No. 1 (1973)
 Chamber Concerto No. 1 for flute and strings (1978)
 Chamber Concerto No. 2 (Cello Concerto No. 2, 1982)
 Violin Concerto No. 2 (1983)
 Chamber Concerto No. 3 (Piano Concerto No. 1, 1985)
 Chamber Concerto No. 4 for horn and ensemble (1987)
 Chamber Concerto No. 5 (Cello Concerto No. 3, 1996)
 Chamber Concerto No. 6 (Piano Concerto No. 2, 1996)

Ensembles 

 Odyssey for 7 players (1990)
 Petrarch's Sonnets (translated by Osip Mandelstam) for voice and ensemble (1976)
 Music for 12 for ensemble (1986)
 Insomnia, for four singers (Pushkin, 1993)
 The Night for voice and saxophone quartet (Boris Pasternak, 1978)
 Stygian Song for soprano and chamber ensemble (Mandelstam, 1989)
 Before the Thunderstorm, cantata for soprano and ensemble (Mandelstam, 1994)
 Black Bells for piano and ensemble (2005)
 Piano Trio, Op. 8 (1972) 9'. Trio, cl, vn, pfn, 1990, 9'. Boosey & Hawkes.

Quartet 

 Amoroso, String Quartet No. 4 (1989)
 Misterioso, String Quartet No. 3 (1980)
 Compassione, String Quartet No. 7 (1995)
 The Stone Guest, String Quartet No. 8 (1995)
 Purgatorio, String Quartet No. 11, completed in 2008
 Silentium for voice and string quartet (Mandelstam, 1991)
 The Door is Closed, String Quartet No. 9 (1996)
 La malinconia, String Quartet No. 10 (1998)
 Lagrimoso, String Quartet No. 5 (1992)
 String Quartet No. 6 (1994)
 Farewell, String Quartet No. 12 (2005)

Cantata 

 The Stone, cantata for voice and symphony orchestra (Mandelstam, 1983)
 Earthly Life, chamber cantata for soprano and ensemble (Mandelstam, 1984)
 Forest walks, cantata for soprano and ensemble (Mandelstam, 1987)

Orchestral 

 Augury for chorus and orchestra (William Blake 1988)
 Nostalgia for orchestra (1989)
 Tristia, cantata for voice and chamber orchestra (Mandelstam, 1979)
 The River of Time for chorus and chamber orchestra in memory of Edison Denisov (Gavrila Derzhavin, 1997)
 Captivity for wind orchestra (1998)
 Leaving for string orchestra (1998)
 Cassandra, for orchestra (1992)
 Secret Way for voice and orchestra (Mandelstam, 1992)
 Das erste ist vergangen (Christushymnus 2000) (The Former Things are Passed Away) for soprano, bass, mixed choir, and chamber orchestra (Franz Kafka, Bible, etc., 1999)
 Requiem for soprano, chorus and orchestra (Anna Akhmatova, 2001)
 The Garden of Dreams, Homage to Dmitri Shostakovich for orchestra (2004)

Opera 

A Feast in Time of Plague, chamber opera after Alexander Pushkin (1973)
 The Nightingale and the Rose, chamber opera after Oscar Wilde  and Christina Rossetti (1991)

Vocal 

Three Poems of Osip Mandelstam, for voice and piano (1980)
 Shakespeare's Sonnets for voice and organ (or saxophone quartet, 1981)
 Seashell for soprano and ensemble (Mandelstam, 1991)
 Whirlpool for voice, flute and percussion (Mandelstam, 1991)
 Distance for voice, clarinet and string quartet (Marina Tsvetaeva, 1992)
 No, it is not a Migraine for baritone and piano (Mandelstam, 1995)
 The Scent of Absence for bass, flute and harp (Oleg Prokofiev, 1998)
 Winter Songs for soprano and cello (Mandelstam, 2003)

Solo 
 Suite for viola solo, Op. 2 (1967)
 Sonata for clarinet solo, Op. 16 (1976)
 For Slava for solo cello (2007)

Discography

 Misterioso, String Quartet No.3 Op.24 in: Lydian Quartet in Moscow: E. Firsova, Chaushian, Child, Lee Art and Electronics: AED 10108 Stereo
 Amoroso, String Quartet No.4 Op.40 in: Chilingirian Quartet: Stravinsky, Schnittke, Smirnov, Roslavets, E. Firsova: Music for String Quartet, Conifer Classics 75605 512522
 La Malinconia, String Quartet No.10 Op.84 in: Brodsky Quartet: Beethoven Op.18 and six more: Alvarez, Beamish, E. Firsova, Jegede, Smirnov, Tanaka, Vanguard Classics 99212
 Chamber Concerto No.1 for Flute and Strings Op.19 in: Works by modern composers of Moscow: Smirnov, Bobilev, E. Firsova, Pavlenko, Artiomov, Mobile Fidelity MFCD 906
 Cassandra for symphony orchestra Op.60 (1992) together with Sofia Gubaidulina: Pro et contra BIS CD-668 STEREO
 The Mandelstam Cantatas (Forest Walks, Earthly Life, Before the Thunderstorm) Studio for New Music Moscow, Igor Dronov, conductor; Ekaterina Kichigina, soprano Megadisc MDC 7816 
 For Alissa Op. 102 (2002) in: RUSSIAN ÉMIGRÉS: Rachmaninov, Smirnov, E. Firsova, A. Firsova:  Alissa Firsova, piano: Vivat 109 DDD
 Homage to Canisy, Op.129 for Cello & Piano
 Lost Vision, Op. 137 for Piano Solo
 A Triple Portrait, Op.132, commissioned by Marsyas Trio (2011)  
 Night Songs, Op.125 for Mezzo-Soprano, Flute & Cello
 Spring Sonata, Op.27 for Flute & Piano
 For Slava, Op.120 for Solo Cello
 Meditation in the Japanese Garden, Op.54 for Flute, Cello & Piano
 Three Poems of Osip Mandelstam, Op.23 for Soprano & Piano 
 Tender is the Sorrow, Op.130 for Flute, String Trio and Piano in: A Triple Portrait. Chamber Music by Elena Firsova – Marsyas Trio, Meridian: CDE84635

Bibliography
 Elena Firsova: On Music; in Sovjetische Music in Licht der Perestroika, pp. 337–8, Laaber-Verlag, Germany, (German translation by Hannelore Gerlach and Jürgen Köchel) 1990

References

Sources
Yuri Kholopov: Russians in England: Dmitri Smirnov, Elena Firsova. Article, in: Music From the Former USSR. Issue 2. Moscow: Composer, 1996, pp. 255–303; Ex oriente...: Ten Composers from the Former USSR. Berlin: Verlag Ernst Kuhn, 2002, pp. 207–266  
Firsova, Yelena Olegovna by Stephen Johnson, in the New Grove Dictionary of Opera, ed. Stanley Sadie (London, 1992)

External links

 
 A Complete List of Works
 Brief biography at Boosey & Hawkes site
 Composer's home page
 Texts of her vocal works at "Recmusic"

20th-century classical composers
21st-century classical composers
Russian women classical composers
Russian classical composers
British women classical composers
Soviet emigrants to the United Kingdom
British opera composers
1950 births
Living people
Musicians from Saint Petersburg
20th-century British composers
21st-century British composers
Women opera composers
20th-century women composers
21st-century women composers